Christianity is a minority in Liaoning, a province of the People's Republic of China. Multimillionaire Leung Moon-Lam intended to build a theme park on the Bible there. The number of Christians in the province has increased dramatically since the Cultural Revolution, having been at about 60,000 in 1965.
A significant minority are of Korean origin. The number of registered churches and meeting points exceeds 1000. The number of Protestants exceeds half a million. The number of Christians in Shenyang was estimated to be 200,000 as of 2000. An estimate for 1996 was 70,000. Shenyang has North East Theological Seminary. 
Liaoning has a far lower number of arrests of Christians than other provinces. Dalian had about 1% Christians in 2003. Fuxin has a Christian population estimated at below 1%.

Roman Catholic dioceses with seat in Liaoning 

Roman Catholic Archdiocese of Shenyang
Roman Catholic Diocese of Fushun
Roman Catholic Diocese of Yingkou

See also 
 Christianity in Liaoning's neighbouring provinces
 Christianity in Hebei
 Christianity in Inner Mongolia
 Christianity in Jilin

References